Gerry Scotti (born Virginio Scotti on 7 August 1956) is an Italian television presenter, actor and former member of the Italian Parliament.

Early years 
Scotti was born Virginio Scotti on 7 August 1956 in Miradolo Terme, Pavia. After giving up studying law, Scotti began his broadcasting career as a disc jockey" at Radio Milano International. In 1982, he moved to Radio DeeJay and a year later became the host of DeeJay Television, the first Italian programme for music videos, broadcast by Italia 1. Scotti also hosted other music programmes such as Festivalbar.

Television career 
Scotti was a member of the Italian Chamber of Deputies of the Italian Socialist Party from 1987 to 1992.

Since the 1990s, Scotti has been a television presenter, almost exclusively for Canale 5. He is known as a quiz show host, having presented Chi vuol essere milionario?, the Italian version of Who Wants to Be a Millionaire?, Passaparola, the Italian version of The Alphabet Game and The Money Drop. He also directed entertainment programmes such as La sai l'ultima?, La Corrida, Paperissima, Buona Domenica (with Harold Davies) and The Winner Is. He was the co-host of the satirical show Striscia la Notizia, and acted in several films and situation comedies.

In 2008, he returned as a host on R101 (the former Radio Milano International), and became deputy-president of Monradio (the radio division of Arnoldo Mondadori Editore).

In 2011, after Who Wants to Be a Millionaire? ended, he presented The Money Drop, until its end in 2013.

He was the host of Avanti un Altro! along with Paolo Bonolis in 2014 and 2015.

In 2015 he presented Guinness World Record and Caduta libera, the Italian version of Who's Still Standing which achieved good ratings.
In the summer of 2017, he presented The Winner Is. In December 2017 he started to present the Italian version of the American game show The Wall. In January 2018 he returned to present Striscia la notizia.

Awards 

Scotti won the Italian television Telegatto prize in 1984, 1985, 1994, 1997, 1999, 2000, 2001, 2002, 2003 and 2007.

In 2008, he won the platinum Telegatto, in the Excellence category. In 2011, he was mentioned in the Guinness World Records as the TV host who hosted the most episodes of Who Wants To Be A Millionaire?.

Personal life 
On 27 October 2020, Scotti tested positive for COVID-19 and spent time in the hospital. He since recovered.

Filmography

Films

Television

References

External links 
 
 Gerry Scotti at Italian Chamber of Deputies website 

1956 births
Living people
People from the Province of Pavia
Italian male actors
Italian television presenters
Who Wants to Be a Millionaire?
Italian radio personalities